Dade Monument is a monument and United States Military Academy Cemetery, in honor of Major Francis L. Dade and his command of 110 men who were defeated by Seminole warriors at Dade Massacre on 28 December, 1835.  The monument has moved several times in its history.  First erected in 1845, it originally stood overlooking the Hudson River on the east edge of the Plain.  It was moved further inland prior to 1898 to make way for the construction of Cullum Hall.  In 1917 it was moved further south in front of the Old Cadet Library.  In 1948, it was relocated to its current location near the entrance to the West Point Cemetery to make way for the Patton Monument.

References

1845 sculptures
Monuments and memorials at West Point
Stone sculptures in New York (state)
1845 establishments in New York (state)
Outdoor sculptures in New York (state)